Hamiltonian mechanics emerged in 1833 as a reformulation of Lagrangian mechanics. Introduced by Sir William Rowan Hamilton, Hamiltonian mechanics replaces (generalized) velocities  used in Lagrangian mechanics with (generalized) momenta. Both theories provide interpretations of classical mechanics and describe the same physical phenomena.

Hamiltonian mechanics has a close relationship with geometry (notably, symplectic geometry and Poisson structures) and serves as a link between classical and quantum mechanics.

Overview

Phase space coordinates (p,q) and Hamiltonian H
Let  be a mechanical system with the configuration space  and the smooth Lagrangian  Select a standard coordinate system  on  The quantities  are called momenta. (Also generalized momenta, conjugate momenta, and canonical momenta).

The Hamiltonian satisfies

which implies that

where the velocities  are found from the (-dimensional) equation  which, by assumption, is uniquely solvable for  The (-dimensional) pair  is called phase space coordinates. (Also canonical coordinates).

From Euler-Lagrange equation to Hamilton's equations
In phase space coordinates  the (-dimensional) Euler-Lagrange equation

becomes Hamilton's equations in  dimensions

From stationary action principle to Hamilton's equations

Basic physical interpretation

A simple interpretation of Hamiltonian mechanics comes from its application on a one-dimensional system consisting of one nonrelativistic particle of mass . Then

The time derivative of the momentum  equals the Newtonian force, and so the second Hamilton equation means that the force equals the negative gradient of potential energy.

Example 

A spherical pendulum consists of a mass m moving without friction on the surface of a sphere. The only forces acting on the mass are the reaction from the sphere and gravity. Spherical coordinates are used to describe the position of the mass in terms of (r, θ, φ), where  is fixed, .
The Lagrangian for this system is

Thus the Hamiltonian is

where

and

In terms of coordinates and momenta, the Hamiltonian reads

Hamilton's equations give the time evolution of coordinates and conjugate momenta in four first-order differential equations,

Momentum , which corresponds to the vertical component of angular momentum , is a constant of motion. That is a consequence of the rotational symmetry of the system around the vertical axis. Being absent from the Hamiltonian, azimuth  is a cyclic coordinate, which implies conservation of its conjugate momentum.

Deriving Hamilton's equations
Hamilton's equations can be derived by a calculation with the Lagrangian , generalized positions , and generalized velocities , where . Here we work off-shell, meaning  are independent coordinates in phase space, not constrained to follow any equations of motion (in particular,  is not a derivative of ).

After rearranging, one obtains:

The term in parentheses on the left-hand side is just the Hamiltonian  defined previously, therefore:

On-shell, one substitutes parametric functions  which define a trajectory in phase space with velocities , obeying Lagrange's equations:

Rearranging and writing in terms of the on-shell  gives:

Thus Lagrange's equations are equivalent to Hamilton's equations:

, Hamilton's equations consist of  first-order differential equations, while Lagrange's equations consist of  second-order equations. Hamilton's equations usually do not reduce the difficulty of finding explicit solutions, but important theoretical results can be derived from them, because coordinates and momenta are independent variables with nearly symmetric roles.

Hamilton's equations have another advantage over Lagrange's equations: if a system has a symmetry, so that some coordinate  does not occur in the Hamiltonian (i.e. a cyclic coordinate), the corresponding momentum coordinate  is conserved along each trajectory, and that coordinate can be reduced to a constant in the other equations of the set. This effectively reduces the problem from  coordinates to  coordinates: this is the basis of symplectic reduction in geometry. In the Lagrangian framework, the conservation of momentum also follows immediately, however all the generalized velocities  still occur in the Lagrangian, and a system of equations in  coordinates still has to be solved.

The Lagrangian and Hamiltonian approaches provide the groundwork for deeper results in classical mechanics, and suggest analogous formulations in quantum mechanics: the path integral formulation and the Schrödinger equation.

Properties of the Hamiltonian
The value of the Hamiltonian  is the total energy of the system if and only if the energy function  has the same property. (See definition of 
 when  form a solution of Hamilton's equations. Indeed,  and everything but the final term cancels out.
 does not change under point transformations, i.e. smooth changes  of space coordinates. (Follows from the invariance of the energy function  under point transformations. The invariance of  can be established directly).
 (See Deriving Hamilton's equations).
 (Compare Hamilton's and Euler-Lagrange equations or see Deriving Hamilton's equations).
 if and only if A coordinate for which the last equation holds is called cyclic (or ignorable). Every cyclic coordinate  reduces the number of degrees of freedom by  causes the corresponding momentum  to be conserved, and makes Hamilton's equations easier to solve.

Hamiltonian of a charged particle in an electromagnetic field

A sufficient illustration of Hamiltonian mechanics is given by the Hamiltonian of a charged particle in an electromagnetic field. In Cartesian coordinates the Lagrangian of a non-relativistic classical particle in an electromagnetic field is (in SI Units):

This Lagrangian, combined with Euler–Lagrange equation, produces the Lorentz force law

and is called minimal coupling.

The canonical momenta are given by:

The Hamiltonian, as the Legendre transformation of the Lagrangian, is therefore:

This equation is used frequently in quantum mechanics.

Under gauge transformation:

where  is any scalar function of space and time, the aforementioned Lagrangian, canonical momenta, and Hamiltonian transform like:

which still produces the same Hamilton's equation:

In quantum mechanics, the wave function will also undergo a local U(1) group transformation during the Gauge Transformation, which implies that all physical results must be invariant under local U(1) transformations.

Relativistic charged particle in an electromagnetic field
The relativistic Lagrangian for a particle (rest mass  and charge ) is given by:

Thus the particle's canonical momentum is

that is, the sum of the kinetic momentum and the potential momentum.

Solving for the velocity, we get

So the Hamiltonian is

This results in the force equation (equivalent to the Euler–Lagrange equation)

from which one can derive

The above derivation makes use of the vector calculus identity:

An equivalent expression for the Hamiltonian as function of the relativistic (kinetic) momentum, is

This has the advantage that kinetic momentum  can be measured experimentally whereas canonical momentum  cannot. Notice that the Hamiltonian (total energy) can be viewed as the sum of the relativistic energy (kinetic+rest), plus the potential energy, .

From symplectic geometry to Hamilton's equations

Geometry of Hamiltonian systems

The Hamiltonian can induce a symplectic structure on a smooth even-dimensional manifold  in several equivalent ways, the best known being the following:

As a closed nondegenerate symplectic 2-form ω. According to the Darboux's theorem, in a small neighbourhood around any point on  there exist suitable local coordinates  (canonical or symplectic coordinates) in which the symplectic form becomes: 

This isomorphism is natural in that it does not change with change of coordinates on  Repeating over all  we end up with an isomorphism  between the infinite-dimensional space of smooth vector fields and that of smooth 1-forms. For every  and 

The respective differential equation on 

is called .

A Hamiltonian system may be understood as a fiber bundle  over time , with the fiber  being the position space at time . The correspondence between Lagrangian and Hamiltonian mechanics is achieved with the tautological one-form.

Any smooth real-valued function  on a symplectic manifold can be used to define a Hamiltonian system. The function  is known as "the Hamiltonian" or "the energy function." The symplectic manifold is then called the phase space. The Hamiltonian induces a special vector field on the symplectic manifold, known as the Hamiltonian vector field.

The Hamiltonian vector field induces a Hamiltonian flow on the manifold. This is a one-parameter family of transformations of the manifold (the parameter of the curves is commonly called "the time"); in other words, an isotopy of symplectomorphisms, starting with the identity. By Liouville's theorem, each symplectomorphism preserves the volume form on the phase space. The collection of symplectomorphisms induced by the Hamiltonian flow is commonly called "the Hamiltonian mechanics" of the Hamiltonian system.

The symplectic structure induces a Poisson bracket. The Poisson bracket gives the space of functions on the manifold the structure of a Lie algebra.

The Poisson bracket has the following properties:
 bilinearity
 antisymmetry
 Leibniz rule: 
 Jacobi identity: 

Given a function 

if there is a probability distribution , then (since the phase space velocity  has zero divergence and probability is conserved) its convective derivative can be shown to be zero and so

This is called Liouville's theorem. Every smooth function  over the symplectic manifold generates a one-parameter family of symplectomorphisms and if , then  is conserved and the symplectomorphisms are symmetry transformations.

A Hamiltonian may have multiple conserved quantities . If the symplectic manifold has dimension  and there are  functionally independent conserved quantities  which are in involution (i.e.), then the Hamiltonian is Liouville integrable. The Liouville–Arnold theorem says that, locally, any Liouville integrable Hamiltonian can be transformed via a symplectomorphism into a new Hamiltonian with the conserved quantities  as coordinates; the new coordinates are called action-angle coordinates.

for some function . There is an entire field focusing on small deviations from integrable systems governed by the KAM theorem.

The integrability of Hamiltonian vector fields is an open question. In general, Hamiltonian systems are chaotic; concepts of measure, completeness, integrability and stability are poorly defined.

Riemannian manifolds

An important special case consists of those Hamiltonians that are quadratic forms, that is, Hamiltonians that can be written as

where  is a smoothly varying inner product on the fibers , the cotangent space to the point  in the configuration space, sometimes called a cometric. This Hamiltonian consists entirely of the kinetic term.

If one considers a Riemannian manifold or a pseudo-Riemannian manifold, the Riemannian metric induces a linear isomorphism between the tangent and cotangent bundles. (See Musical isomorphism). Using this isomorphism, one can define a cometric. (In coordinates, the matrix defining the cometric is the inverse of the matrix defining the metric.) The solutions to the Hamilton–Jacobi equations for this Hamiltonian are then the same as the geodesics on the manifold. In particular, the Hamiltonian flow in this case is the same thing as the geodesic flow. The existence of such solutions, and the completeness of the set of solutions, are discussed in detail in the article on geodesics. See also Geodesics as Hamiltonian flows.

Sub-Riemannian manifolds
When the cometric is degenerate, then it is not invertible. In this case, one does not have a Riemannian manifold, as one does not have a metric. However, the Hamiltonian still exists. In the case where the cometric is degenerate at every point  of the configuration space manifold , so that the rank of the cometric is less than the dimension of the manifold , one has a sub-Riemannian manifold.

The Hamiltonian in this case is known as a sub-Riemannian Hamiltonian. Every such Hamiltonian uniquely determines the cometric, and vice versa. This implies that every sub-Riemannian manifold is uniquely determined by its sub-Riemannian Hamiltonian, and that the converse is true: every sub-Riemannian manifold has a unique sub-Riemannian Hamiltonian. The existence of sub-Riemannian geodesics is given by the Chow–Rashevskii theorem.

The continuous, real-valued Heisenberg group provides a simple example of a sub-Riemannian manifold. For the Heisenberg group, the Hamiltonian is given by

 is not involved in the Hamiltonian.

Poisson algebras

Hamiltonian systems can be generalized in various ways. Instead of simply looking at the algebra of smooth functions over a symplectic manifold, Hamiltonian mechanics can be formulated on general commutative unital real Poisson algebras. A state is a continuous linear functional on the Poisson algebra (equipped with some suitable topology) such that for any element  of the algebra,  maps to a nonnegative real number.

A further generalization is given by Nambu dynamics.

Generalization to quantum mechanics through Poisson bracket

Hamilton's equations above work well for classical mechanics, but not for quantum mechanics, since the differential equations discussed assume that one can specify the exact position and momentum of the particle simultaneously at any point in time.

Specifically, the more general form of the Hamilton's equation reads

To find out the rules for evaluating a Poisson bracket without resorting to differential equations, see Lie algebra; a Poisson bracket is the name for the Lie bracket in a Poisson algebra. These Poisson brackets can then be extended to Moyal brackets comporting to an inequivalent Lie algebra, as proven by Hilbrand J. Groenewold, and thereby describe quantum mechanical diffusion in phase space (See the phase space formulation and the Wigner–Weyl transform). This more algebraic approach not only permits ultimately extending probability distributions in phase space to Wigner quasi-probability distributions, but, at the mere Poisson bracket classical setting, also provides more power in helping analyze the relevant conserved quantities in a system.

See also

 Canonical transformation
 Classical field theory
 Hamiltonian field theory
 Covariant Hamiltonian field theory
 Classical mechanics
 Dynamical systems theory
 Hamiltonian system
 Hamilton–Jacobi equation
 Hamilton–Jacobi–Einstein equation
 Lagrangian mechanics
 Maxwell's equations
 Hamiltonian (quantum mechanics)
 Quantum Hamilton's equations
 Quantum field theory
 Hamiltonian optics
 De Donder–Weyl theory
 Geometric mechanics
 Routhian mechanics
 Nambu mechanics
 Hamiltonian fluid mechanics
 Hamiltonian vector field

References

Further reading

External links

  
 
 

 
Classical mechanics
Dynamical systems
Mathematical physics